Digital at Montreux, 1980 is a live album by trumpeter Dizzy Gillespie with Toots Thielemans and Bernard Purdie recorded at the Montreux Jazz Festival in 1980 and released on the Pablo label.

Reception
The Allmusic review stated "Purdie, a consummate funk and R&B percussionist, makes the switch to mainstream material adequately, while Gillespie and Thielemans establish a quick, consistent rapport".

Track listing
 Introduction by Claude Nobs - 0:51 
 "Christopher Columbus" (Chu Berry, Andy Razaf) - 9:30 
 "I'm Sitting on Top of the World" (Ray Henderson, Sam M. Lewis, Joe Young) - 12:20 
 "Manteca" (Gil Fuller, Dizzy Gillespie, Chano Pozo) - 9:20 
 "Get That Booty" (Gillespie) - 2:22 
 "Kisses" (Gillespie) - 6:40

Personnel
Dizzy Gillespie - trumpet, piano, cowbell, Jew's harp, vocals
Toots Thielemans - guitar
Bernard Purdie - drums

References 

Pablo Records live albums
Dizzy Gillespie live albums
Albums recorded at the Montreux Jazz Festival
1981 live albums